Urolka is a rural locality (a selo) in Solikamsky District, Perm Krai, Russia. The population was 120 as of 2010. There are 5 streets.

Geography 
Urolka is located 81 km northwest of Solikamsk (the district's administrative centre) by road. Basim is the nearest rural locality.

References 

Rural localities in Solikamsky District